Parliamentary elections were held in Austria on 17 October 1920, although they were not held in Carinthia until 19 June 1921 and in Burgenland until 18 June 1922. They were the first regular elections held after a permanent constitution was promulgated two weeks earlier.

The result was a victory for the Christian Social Party, which won 85 of the 183 seats. Voter turnout was 80%.

Results
Following the election, a coalition was formed between the CS and GDVP.

References

Austria
Legislative
Elections in Austria
Austria